Radulodon is a genus of toothed crust fungi in the family Meruliaceae. The genus was circumscribed in 1972 by Norwegian mycologist Leif Ryvarden, with R. americanus as the type species.

Species
Radulodon acaciae G.Kaur, Avneet P.Singh & Dhingra (2014) – India
Radulodon americanus Ryvarden (1972)
Radulodon aneirinus (Sommerf.) Spirin (2001)
Radulodon casearius (Morgan) Ryvarden (1972)
Radulodon cirrhatinus Hjortstam & Spooner (1990) – Malaysia
Radulodon copelandii (Pat.) N.Maek. (1993)
Radulodon erikssonii Ryvarden (1972)
Radulodon indicus Jyoti & Dhingra (2014)
Radulodon licentii (Pilát) Ryvarden (1976)
Radulodon revolubilis Hjortstam & Ryvarden (2007) – Venezuela
Radulodon subvinosus (Berk. & Broome) Stalpers (1998)

References

Fungi described in 1972
Meruliaceae
Polyporales genera
Taxa named by Leif Ryvarden